Coleophora incultella is a moth of the family Coleophoridae that is endemic to Algeria.

References

External links

incultella
Moths of Africa
Endemic fauna of Algeria
Moths described in 1952